Lucchetti is an Italian surname. Notable people with the surname include:

Cristian Lucchetti (born 1978), Argentine footballer
Domenico Lucchetti (1623–1707), Italian Roman Catholic bishop
Héctor Lucchetti, Argentine fencer
Luis Lucchetti (1902–1990), Argentine fencer
Rubens Francisco Lucchetti, Brazilian writer
Vittorio Lucchetti (1894–1965), Italian gymnast

Italian-language surnames